James Barrett (May 31, 1814April 21, 1900) was a Vermont lawyer, politician and judge who served as President of the Vermont State Senate and a justice of the Vermont Supreme Court.

Early life
James Barrett was born in Strafford, Vermont on May 31, 1814.  He graduated from Dartmouth College in 1838, and received a master's degree in 1841.  Barrett studied law, first with James Crocker of Buffalo, New York and later with Charles Marsh.

Start of career
In 1840 Barrett began to practice law in Woodstock as Marsh's partner.

In 1843 he became the partner of Jacob Collamer.  From 1848 to 1849 Barrett practiced law in Boston, and upon returning to Woodstock he formed a partnership with Andrew Tracy and Julius Converse.

Political career
A Whig, in 1844 and 1845 Barrett was elected to term in the Vermont Senate, and he was chosen by his peers to serve as Senate President in 1845.  From 1854 to 1855 he was Windsor County State's Attorney.

In 1857, by now a Republican, Barrett was appointed to the Vermont Supreme Court, where he served until 1880.

In 1865 Barrett received an honorary LL.D. from Middlebury College.  Barrett also served as President of the Dartmouth College Alumni Association and the Vermont Bar Association.

Later life
After leaving the bench Barrett resided in Rutland, and practiced law with his son James Crocker Barrett.  After the younger Barrett's 1887 death the elder Barrett lived in retirement in Rutland.

Death and burial
James Barrett died in Rutland on April 21, 1900.  He was buried in Rutland's Evergreen Cemetery.

References

1814 births
1900 deaths
Dartmouth College alumni
People from Strafford, Vermont
People from Woodstock, Vermont
People from Rutland (city), Vermont
Vermont lawyers
State's attorneys in Vermont
Vermont Whigs
19th-century American politicians
Vermont Republicans
Vermont state senators
Presidents pro tempore of the Vermont Senate
Justices of the Vermont Supreme Court
Burials at Evergreen Cemetery (Rutland, Vermont)
19th-century American judges
19th-century American lawyers